Jonathan Bellis (born 16 August 1988) is a Manx former racing cyclist from Douglas, who rode professionally between 2008 and 2015 for the , ,  and  teams. He represented Great Britain on the track and the roads. Bellis briefly worked as a directeur sportif for UCI Women's Team  in 2019, but was suspended, after being convicted of assault.

Career
Bellis emerged from the British Olympic Academy Programme. After success in European track championships, he became Britain's first medalist at the under-23 world road championship, in 2007, finishing third. He represented Britain at the 2008 Olympic Games in the road race.

On 19 September 2009, he crashed on a motor scooter near the Great Britain academy training base in Quarrata, Italy. At first he was in a critical condition, but soon became stable. He began awaking from his induced coma four weeks later. His skull had been shattered by the accident, and he had suffered fractures to the nose, cheekbones and sternum and a blood clot on his spine. Doctors initially feared that he would be quadraplegic, and he subsequently contracted infections, suffered a stroke and twice underwent an emergency tracheotomy. However Bellis managed to start riding again ten months after the accident and returned to competition at the 2010 Tour of Britain, a year after the crash.

In 2012, he joined the  team. Subsequently, he joined the ILLI-Bikes Cycling Team, a Belgian amateur squad, in 2013. Bellis returned to the professional peloton in 2014, securing a deal with the  team. After one season Bellis was announced as part of the inaugural squad for the  team in 2015.

In December 2015 he announced via Twitter that he was retiring from professional competition. In an interview later that month he said he was hoping to remain involved in the sport in a coaching role. He was subsequently appointed as a coach at Lee Valley VeloPark.

Major results

2005
 4th Overall Junior Tour of Wales
1st Stage 4
2006
 1st  Team pursuit, UEC European Junior Track Championships
 1st  Individual pursuit, National Junior Track Championships
 1st Stage 4 Junior Tour of Wales
2007
 UEC European Under-23 Track Championships
1st  Points race
1st  Scratch
 3rd  Road race, UCI Under-23 Road World Championships
2008
 Under-23 UIV Cup
1st Berlin
1st Copenhagen
 3rd Road race, National Road Championships
2009
 8th Tour de Rijke

References

External links
 
 
 Jonathan Bellis Rider Profile – Cycling Weekly

Cyclists at the 2008 Summer Olympics
Manx male cyclists
Olympic cyclists of Great Britain
British track cyclists
1988 births
Living people
British cycling coaches
Directeur sportifs